The ChS2  is an electric mainline DC passenger locomotive used in Russia and Ukraine. It was manufactured by the Škoda Works in Czechoslovakia between 1958 and 1973.

Gallery

See also

 The Museum of the Moscow Railway, at Paveletsky Rail Terminal, Moscow
 Rizhsky Rail Terminal, Moscow, Home of the Moscow Railway Museum
 Varshavsky Rail Terminal, St.Petersburg, Home of the Central Museum of Railway Transport, Russian Federation
 History of rail transport in Russia

References 

Railway locomotives introduced in 1958
Škoda locomotives
Electric locomotives of Russia
Electric locomotives of Ukraine
Electric locomotives of the Soviet Union
3000 V DC locomotives
5 ft gauge locomotives